California's State Assembly districts are numbered 1st through 80th, generally in north-to-south order.

The California State Assembly is the lower house of the California State Legislature. The Assembly has 80 members, each representing one district.

In accordance with the Article XXI of the California Constitution, assembly district boundaries are redrawn every ten years based on data from the United States Census. The current boundaries were drawn in 2011 by a California Citizens Redistricting Commission.  The census enumerated population of each district was within 1% of 465,674 with an average absolute deviation of 0.506%.

Due to the state's large population and relatively small legislature, the Assembly has the largest population per representative ratio of any lower house legislature in the United States; only the federal U.S. House of Representatives has a larger ratio. Since Proposition 28 passed in 2012, members of the Legislature are limited to a total of 12 years of legislative service, which can be served in the Assembly, Senate, or a combination of both.

The Democratic State Central Committee, the governing body of the California Democratic Party, elects roughly 1/3 of its members from Assembly district election meetings held biennially in January in every odd-numbered year within each of the 80 Assembly districts.

List

1st - Lassen, Modoc, Nevada, Plumas, Shasta, Sierra, and Siskiyou counties, and portions of Butte and Placer counties
2nd - Del Norte, Humboldt, Trinity, and Mendocino counties, and portions of Sonoma county
3rd - Glenn, Sutter, Tehama, and Yuba counties, and portions of Butte and Colusa counties
4th - Lake and Napa counties, and portions of Yolo, Colusa, Sonoma, and Solano counties
5th - Madera, Amador, Tuolumne, Calaveras, Mariposa, Mono, and Alpine counties, and portions of El Dorado and Placer counties
6th - portions of El Dorado, Placer, and Sacramento counties
7th - portions of western Sacramento and eastern Yolo counties
8th - portions of eastern Sacramento county
9th - portions of southern Sacramento and northern San Joaquin counties
10th - Marin county and portions of Sonoma county
11th - portions of southern Solano, eastern Contra Costa, and southwestern Sacramento counties 
12th - portions of San Joaquin and Stanislaus counties
13th - portions of western San Joaquin county
14th - portions of Contra Costa and western Solano county
15th - portions of northern Alameda and western Contra Costa counties
16th - portions of eastern Alameda and central Contra Costa counties
17th - portions of San Francisco
18th - cities of Alameda, San Leandro, and most of Oakland in Alameda county
19th - portions of San Francisco and northern San Mateo county
20th - portions of central and southern Alameda county
21st - Merced county and portions of Stanislaus county
22nd - portions of San Mateo county
23rd - portions of eastern Fresno and northeastern Tulare counties
24th - portions of southern San Mateo and western Santa Clara counties
25th - portions of southern Alameda and northeastern Santa Clara counties
26th - Inyo county and portions of Tulare and Kern counties
27th - downtown and eastern San Jose
28th - portions of western Santa Clara county
29th - portions of northern Monterey, central Santa Cruz, and southwestern Santa Clara counties
30th - San Benito county, and portions of Monterey, southern Santa Cruz, and southern Santa Clara counties 
31st - portions of western Fresno county
32nd - Kings county and portions of western Kern county
33rd - rural portions of San Bernardino county (Victorville, Barstow and Needles)
34th - portions of Kern county
35th - San Luis Obispo and portions of northern Santa Barbara county
36th - portions of eastern Kern, northern Los Angeles, and western San Bernardino counties
37th - portions of eastern Santa Barbara and western Ventura counties
38th - portions of northern Los Angeles and eastern Ventura counties
39th - northern Los Angeles and San Fernando
40th - suburban San Bernardino County (Rancho Cucamonga, Highland, and Redlands)
41st - San Gabriel Mountain communities in Los Angeles and San Bernardino counties (Pasadena, San Dimas, and Upland)
42nd - portions of rural San Bernardino and Riverside Counties (Yucaipa, San Jacinto, and Palm Desert)
43rd - parts of Los Angeles County (Burbank, Glendale, and parts of Los Angeles)
44th - coastal Ventura County with a small portion of Los Angeles County (Thousand Oaks, Camarillo and Oxnard)
45th - Bell Canyon and parts of Los Angeles (Encino, Northridge, and Woodland Hills)
46th - parts of Los Angeles (Panorama City, Sherman Oaks, and Van Nuys)
47th - urban San Bernardino County (San Bernardino, Rialto, and Fontana)
48th - eastern San Gabriel Valley (Covina, El Monte, and West Covina)
49th - western San Gabriel Valley (El Monte, Montebello, South El Monte)
50th - western Los Angeles County (Malibu, Santa Monica, and Beverly Hills)
51st - northeastern Los Angeles (Chinatown, East Los Angeles, Echo Park)
52nd - extreme western parts of the Inland Empire (Montclair, Ontario, Pomona)
53rd - Downtown Los Angeles
54th - parts of Los Angeles' westside (Crenshaw, UCLA) and Culver City
55th - intersection of Los Angeles, Orange, and San Bernardino counties (Brea, La Habra, Yorba Linda)
56th - the Imperial Valley and parts of the Coachella Valley and the Colorado Desert (Blythe, Calexico, Coachella)
57th - parts of Los Angeles County (Hacienda Heights, Norwalk, Whittier)
58th - part of the Gateway Cities region and Interstate 605 (Bell Gardens, Downey, Pico Gardens)
59th - South Los Angeles along Interstate 110 (Florence, University Park, Vermont Square)
60th - northwestern corner of Riverside County (Corona, Jurupa Valley, and Norco)
61st - central section of the Inland Empire in northwestern Riverside County (Mead Valley, Moreno Valley, Riverside)
62nd - part of Los Angeles County centered on Los Angeles International Airport (El Segundo, Inglewood, Venice)
63rd - part of the Gateway Cities region southeast of Los Angeles County (Bell, Lakewood, Paramount)
64th - parts of south Los Angeles and the South Bay (Carson, Compton, Rancho Dominguez)
65th - northern Orange County (Cypress, Fullerton, Stanton)
66th - southern coast of Los Angeles County (Hermosa Beach, Torrance, and Ranchos Palos Verdes) 
67th - southern Inland Empire in western Riverside County (French Valley, Lake Elsinore, Murrieta)
68th - inland central Orange County (Irvine, Lake Forest, Orange)
69th - heart of Orange County (Anaheim, Orange, Santa Ana)
70th - southern coast of Los Angeles County (Long Beach, Los Angeles' San Pedro, and Catalina Island)
71st - rural eastern San Diego County and southwest Riverside County (El Cajon and various Kumeyaay Indian Reservations)
72nd - Fountain Valley, Garden Grove, Huntington Beach, Los Alamitos, Midway City, Rossmoor, Santa Ana, Seal Beach, Westminster
73rd - southern Orange County (Aliso Viejo, Dana Point, Mission Viejo)
74th - coastal central Orange County (Costa Mesa, Huntington Beach, Irvine, Laguna Beach, Laguna Woods, Newport Beach)
75th - southernmost reaches of the Inland Empire and the inland parts of North County (Escondido, Rainbow, San Marcos)
76th - coastal San Diego County (Encinitas, Carlsbad, and Oceanside)
77th - inland northern San Diego (Clairemont, Miramar, Poway)
78th - southern coastal San Diego County (Del Mar, Imperial Beach) and San Diego's La Jolla neighborhood
79th - southeastern San Diego and its closest eastern suburbs
80th - southern of San Diego County (Chula Vista and San Diego)

See also
California State Senate districts
California Assembly
Districts in California

References

External links
California Legislative District Maps (1911-Present)
RAND California Election Returns: District Definitions (out of date)
California State Assembly
Current Candidates for the State Assembly
Map of State Assembly Districts
Find Your California Representative